Darren Doane (born September 20, 1972) is an American filmmaker, actor, and music video director. He started his early music video work with Ken Daurio and directed several early Blink-182 music videos.

Prior to directing commercials and music videos, Darren also directed two live action short film adaptations of the Malibu Comics superheroes Hardcase (a six-minute music video style promo starring British kickboxer Gary Daniels) and Firearm (a 35-minute movie which served as a prequel to the actual comic).

Filmography

Film

Short film

References

External links

1972 births
American documentary filmmakers
American music video directors
Living people
People from Westlake Village, California